Helen Clayton (born 17 June 1971) is a former English female rugby union player born in Billinge Higher End near Wigan. She represented  at the 2006 Women's Rugby World Cup. She retired after the 2006 World Cup. She is currently the manager of HITZ Rugby, a community programme run by Premiership Rugby.

References

1971 births
Living people
England women's international rugby union players
English female rugby union players
Rugby union players from Greater Manchester